The 2007 Plateau State gubernatorial election was the 6th gubernatorial election of Plateau State. Held on April 14, 2007, the People's Democratic Party nominee Jonah David Jang won the election, defeating Pam Dung Gyang of the Action Congress of Nigeria.

Results 
Jonah David Jang from the People's Democratic Party won the election, defeating Pam Dung Gyang from the Action Congress of Nigeria. Registered voters was 1,602,550.

References 

Plateau State gubernatorial elections
Plateau gubernatorial
April 2007 events in Nigeria